The Misery River is a  river on the Keweenaw Peninsula of the U.S. state of Michigan.

Tributaries 

References 

Rivers of Michigan
Rivers of Houghton County, Michigan
Rivers of Ontonagon County, Michigan
Tributaries of Lake Superior